Alfred Johnson may refer to:

Alfred "Centennial" Johnson (1846–1927), Danish-born fisherman and sailor
Alfred Wilkinson Johnson (1876–1963), U.S. Navy officer
Alfred F. Johnson (1884–1972), English academic librarian and expert in typography
Alfred I. Johnson (1898–1977), Minnesota politician
Al Johnson (musician) (1948–2013), American R&B singer, writer, arranger and producer
Alfred E. Johnson, anthropologist and archaeologist at the University of Kansas
Alfred C. Johnson, American molecular biologist

See also
Alfred Johnson Brooks (1890–1967), Canadian parliamentarian
Al Johnson (disambiguation)